Zhao Yufei (born January 18, 1989) is a Paralympian athlete from China competing mainly in category T53 sprint events. Yufei competed in the 2012 Summer Paralympics in London where he won a silver in the 100m and bronze in the 200m.

External links
  (archive)

Paralympic athletes of China
Paralympic bronze medalists for China
Paralympic silver medalists for China
Chinese male sprinters
Living people
Medalists at the 2012 Summer Paralympics
Athletes (track and field) at the 2012 Summer Paralympics
Athletes (track and field) at the 2016 Summer Paralympics
1989 births
Sportspeople from Shijiazhuang
Runners from Hebei
Paralympic medalists in athletics (track and field)